Aethiophysa crambidalis is a moth in the family Crambidae. It is found on Curaçao.

The wingspan is 15–16 mm. The forewings are ochreous brown with two dark grey crosslines. The hindwings are shining white.

References

Moths described in 1887
Glaphyriinae
Moths of the Caribbean